The Femco Farms consisted of five farm properties established in Wilkin County, Minnesota, United States, in the 1920s and 1930s to experiment with livestock breeding and agricultural diversification.  They were created by Frederick E. Murphy, publisher of the Minneapolis Tribune newspaper, to demonstrate improved techniques like crop rotation that could benefit farmers.  The Femco Farms became famous for their influential practices, and especially for their incredibly productive dairy cows.  The best preserved of the five properties, Femco Farm No. 2, was listed on the National Register of Historic Places in 1980 for its local significance in the area of agriculture.

History
Ordered by his doctor in 1918 to spend more time outdoors to combat frail health, newspaper publisher Frederick E. Murphy moved from Minneapolis to his wife's family farm in Wilkin County. He had long dreamed of experimenting with improved agricultural techniques, and began buying farm properties in the area. The name he gave them, "Femco", was based on his initials.

The Femco Farms grew oats, barley, corn, alfalfa, sweet clover, rye, and flax.  More importantly, Murphy invested exclusively in purebred livestock, namely Percheron horses, Duroc Jersey hogs, McKarrow Shropshire sheep, white Orpington chickens, and Holstein dairy cows.  The farms experimented with stock raising, crop rotation, and soil fertilization, and promoted diversified farming—rather than the usual focus on a few cash crops—as the solution to many of the agricultural challenges of the day.

However the Femco Farms were particularly famous for their dairy cows, winning numerous awards. One Holstein cow, Lady Pride, was showcased at the 1932 Minnesota State Fair. Another Holstein, Daisy Aaggie Ormsby III, produced  of butter over the course of a year, a new record. Murphy claimed that the yields his animals achieved could be reproduced by typical farmers using his techniques.

Murphy became president of the Minneapolis Tribune in 1921 and moved back to Minneapolis.  After his death in 1940, the Femco Farm properties were auctioned off to separate owners.  His award-winning dairy herds were sold as well, with some cows fetching $4,000 each.

Location
Though its structures are quite dilapidated, it is readily visible from U.S. Route 75. Femco Farm No. 2 is in Roberts Township just north of Kent. Farm No. 3 was in Mitchell Township, No. 4 was located just north of No. 1, and No. 5 was in Manston Township. A sixth property known as Femco No Number, at which the farms' manager lived, was one mile north of Breckenridge.

Femco Farm No. 2
Femco Farm No. 2 totaled .  It was established in 1922, and 12 structures were built that year or shortly after.  Still extant at the time of the property's National Register nomination in 1979 were the foreman and workers' house, a granary, milk house, dairy barn, silo, hog barn, sheep barn, horse barn, and machine shed.  Three original structures—a chicken coop, windmill, and guest house for Murphy—had been demolished.  The dairy barn is particularly distinctive, consisting of two large gambrel-roofed wings joined by a connecting hallway with its own gambrel roof.

Femco Farm No. 2 was nominated to the National Register of Historic Places as the best preserved of the five Femco Farms, which "had a lasting impact on the agricultural history of Wilkin County—and through its breeding stock, on U.S. agriculture."

See also
 National Register of Historic Places listings in Wilkin County, Minnesota

References

Buildings and structures in Wilkin County, Minnesota
Farms on the National Register of Historic Places in Minnesota
National Register of Historic Places in Wilkin County, Minnesota